Christoffer "Chris" (Neymar) Holsten (born May 4, 1993) is a Norwegian singer, songwriter and producer.

Career
Holsten comes from a musical family. He played the title role in a Norwegian language musical production Oliver that played in the Lillestrøm Cultural Center in 2003 when he was just 10 years old. He also ended up with roles in other stage presentations like Skatten på Sjørøverøya and Scrooge and at age 17 started putting musical materials online, ending up with a contract with the Circle management group.

An avid sportsman, he joined the junior level football (soccer) with the local Lillestrøm SK football club following both music and sports simultaneously.

2014–present 
Holsten came to prominence when he was featured in the vocals of Norwegian duo Broiler's 2014 hit "Rays of Light" although he was not credited in the official title of the release. The song reached number 1 on the Billboard Hot Dance Club Songs chart and number 2 on US Billboard Dance/Electronic Songs chart, also charting on VG-lista, the official Norwegian Singles Chart. His vocals were featured also on Martin Björk 2015 song "Ricochet", charting number 1 on iTunes in Sweden. Holsten co-wrote «Happiness», the debut single South Korean girl group Red Velvet released in 2014 alongside Will Simms, Chad Hugo (of The Neptunes) and Anne Judith Wik (of Dsign Music). The song made it number 1 in South Korean Gaon Music Chart.

Holsten released his debut single titled "Layers" written by Holsten along with Katrin Fröder, Anders Kjær and Bernt Rune Stray. A music video was also launched for the song directed by Christian Bastiansen featuring dancer Ragnhild Skar Hajum.

In 2016 he got signed to Warner Music Norway and shortly after he released his single "On My Own" with Norwegian production duo Rat City. The single led him to join the official Norwegian Charts Tour, even though the song never made it to the hit-list itself.

In 2017, he released the song "Mexico" which was a huge success with over 12 million streams on Spotify, followed by the songs "Echo" and "All About You" which he did with Madden. For the second year in a row, Chris performed at VG-Lista Rådhusplassen, in addition to Vulkan Arena, P3 Christine Live and Senkveld.

In 2020, Chris Holsten started the year with the single "Wish I Never Met You" and later "Empty Bottle" which are both to be found on the follow-up EP. The autumn of 2020 started with a solo tour that was to include seven concerts in Norway. The tour started with a concert in Eide, but the remaining concerts were abruptly put on hold due to the pandemic ( covid-19 ) that broke out in 2020. On April 17, 2020, he released his first EP Cold Hearts.

At the beginning of April 2020, Chris Holsten and Frida Ånnevik performed their Norwegian interpretation of the song "If The World Was Ending" by JP Saxe and Julia Michaels. Their version, "If the World", was initially only broadcast on live radio. They also made a recorded version with a video that was later shared on social media. In March 2020, when the Corona pandemic occurred in Norway, the song took on a whole new dimension. The song was officially released and quickly climbed into the VG-List Top 20 where it was for 19 weeks with 10th place as the best position.

Discography

Albums
 Bak en fasade (2022) – No. 2 Norway

Singles
Solo
"Layers" (2015)
"Unproved" (2015)
"On My Own" (featuring Rat City) (2016)
"Strip" (2016)
"Here We Go Again" (2016)
"Mexico" (2017)
"All About You" (with Madden) (2017)
"Love Like This" (2018)
"Time Machine" (2018)
"Happy Tears" (2018)

Featuring
"Rays of Light" – Broiler (2014)
"Ricochet" – Martin Björk (2015)
"Echo" – Madden (2017)

Cover
"Stole the Show" – cover of Kygo (2015)

References

External links
Official website
Soundcloud
Facebook
YouTube
Instagram

Norwegian songwriters
1993 births
Living people
People from Lillestrøm
21st-century Norwegian singers
21st-century Norwegian male singers